= Jerry Watts =

Jerry Gafio Watts (May 17, 1953 – November 16, 2015) was a professor of English at the City University of New York Graduate Center and a leading American scholar of Afro-American literature, culture, and politics. Notable works include Heroism and the Black Intellectual: Reflections on Ralph Ellison, Politics, and Afro-American Intellectual Life (1994) and Amiri Baraka: The Politics and Art of a Black Intellectual (2001). Dr. Watts also wrote an Open Letter to My Students and Anyone Else discussing some of the challenges faced by students where he offers practical advice to doctoral students from personal experience and a long career in academia. This letter was posted in memoriam in Warscapes magazine.

He earned degrees from Harvard College (BA) and Yale University (PhD).
